Halol is a city and a municipality (tehsil) in Panchmahal district in the Indian state of Gujarat. Located in western India, it has an average elevation of 499 metres (1637 feet). Halol is a major manufacturing hub of Western India, home to manufacturing facilities of numerous domestic and multinational companies like MG Motor India, Siemens Gamesa, JCB India, Hero Motocorp, Sun Pharma, TOTO India, CEAT Tyres, LM Wind Power, Polycab India, etc.

Demography
 India census, Halol city had a population of 61000. Males constituted 53% of the population and females 47%. Halol had an average literacy rate of 72%, higher than the national average of 59.5%: male literacy was 76%, and female literacy was 66%. In Halol, 14% of the population was under 6 years of age.

Geography
Situated at Latitude = 22° 30′ 0″ N (22.5) and Longitude = 73° 28′ 0″ E (73.46667)
There is a large body of water that was built in 1938 to provide the city with a dependable water supply. Halol is around 40 km from Bodeli, Vadodara and Godhra.
It is also near to the tourist spot Pavagadh, a World Heritage Site Champaner.

Hospitals

Many hospitals and clinics like Referral Hospital, Shree Rang Hospital,  Niramay Hospital are available in the city. Halol hospital and ICU hospital with all the necessary facilities and emergency treatment for dealing with cardiac and diabetic conditions.

Industry

Many large companies are located here including MG Motor India, Siemens Gamesa, Hero Motocorp, Sun Pharma, TOTO India, CEAT Tyres, JCB, LM Wind Power, Polycab India, etc.

Schools and colleges
In the city of Halol there are various Gujarati, English and Hindi medium schools. They include V.M English medium school, MGM English medium School Halol, M S High School(Gujarati Medium) Halol, Saraswati Vidya Mandir (Gujarati / English Medium) Halol, Kalrav English/Gujarati School Halol, Veer New Look Central School Halol (CBSE), M&V Commerce and Arts College Halol and Nutan Kedavni trust School (Gujarati Med.).

Places of interest

 Pavagadh Shwetambar Jain Mandir * At about 10Km from Halol a very ancient Shwetambar Jain temple is situated. According to Shwetambar records also, this Mandir Ji is very ancient. There is a reference available of a Mandir Ji called “Sarvatobhadra” (auspicious on all sides) built here at the instance of Minister Sri Tejpal during 13th Vikram century. Also a reference is available about ceremonial installation and consecration the hands of Acharya Sri Vijaysensuriji of a temple built at the instance of Sri Jayawant Sheth in Vikram year 1638. IN Vikram year 1746 Gani Sri Shilvijayji Maharaj has referred to a temple here of Sri Neminath Bhagwan. In a laudatory poem about Sri Jiravala Parshvanath composed by Sri Dipvijayji Maharaj in 19th Vikram century, the Mandir Ji existing here are described in detail. At one time, this shrine was considered to be of equal ranks to the shrine at Mt. Shatrunjay. The remnants of ancient ruins lying scattered on the mountain remind one of its antiquity. 

 Tomb of Sikandar Shah *

References

Cities and towns in Panchmahal district